Adrián Ademir Ascues Earl (born 15 November 2002) is a Peruvian footballer who plays as a midfielder for Peruvian Primera División side Deportivo Municipal.

Career

Club career
Ascues joined Deportivo Municipal from Sporting Cristal. He got his official debut in the Peruvian Primera División for Deportivo Municipal at the age of 17 against Deportivo Llacuabamba on 8 September 2020. He started on the bench, but replaced Rodrigo Vilca after 81 minutes.

In the 2022 season in Deportivo Municipal, Ascues would become an important figure for the team as he score 10 goals, along with 2 assists throughout the season.

Personal life
Adrián's uncle, Carlos Ascues, is also a professional footballer.

References

External links
 
 

2002 births
Living people
Association football midfielders
Peruvian footballers
Peruvian Primera División players
Deportivo Municipal footballers